Tusha Shinni (Bengali: তুশা শিন্নি) is one type of flour halwa, a popular desert in the Sylhet region of Bangladesh. This dish from the cuisine of Sylhet is lightly spicy, soft and sweet. This traditional food is very famous in different religious occasions.

Ingredients 
Flour, sugar, oil and butter, cardamom, crunchy almond , raisins, cinnamon and water.

Procedure 
First, water is boiled in a pot adding cinnamon and cardamom. When the water is hot, sugar is added to make a syrup. Thin syrup is good for the best texture. The sugar syrup is then mixed with flour on medium low flame. The mixture is stirred repeatedly until the Tusha turns brown and the water is absorbed. By this way, the consistency will be a soft sugary dough. If the mixture is burned, it will taste bitter. When the process is done, the sugar syrup will be absorbed by the flour. It is usually served with raisins and almonds.

See also 

Bangladeshi cuisine
Bengali cuisine
List of desserts
 List of Bangladeshi sweets and desserts

References

Desserts
Sweet pies
Sylheti cuisine
Religious food and drink
Confectionery